(Char-)Lotta Hedström, earlier Nilsson Hedström, (born 13 September 1955 in Stockholm) is a Swedish Green Party politician. She was a member of the Riksdag 2002–06.  During her time as a spokesperson, her name was Lotta Nilsson Hedström.

External links
Lotta Hedström at the Riksdag website

Living people
1955 births
Women members of the Riksdag
Members of the Riksdag 2002–2006
21st-century Swedish women politicians
Members of the Riksdag from the Green Party